The National Archives of Cameroon (French: Archives nationales du Cameroun) (est. 1966) is the national archives of Cameroon. Its main location is in Yaoundé and has a library which holds 64,000 volumes. There is an annex in Buea with early material. Maintenance of the National Archives falls within the responsibilities of the Ministry of Arts and Culture.  The archive closed in 2016 for what promises to be a long running reorganization and digitization of its files.  Researchers can still request access by writing to the director with a list of specific documents they wish to access.  It is also possible to order digital photos of documents for a fee.

Directors
 Claude Burgaud, 1952-1957
 Raymond Bonnefils, 1957-1958
 Louis Buttin, 1958-1960
 Henri Djeengue Ndoumbe, 1960-1961
 Alfred-Eugene Madjire Pfouma, 1961-1964
 Marc Etende, 1964-1972
 Mathias Sack, circa 1972
 Dr. Esther Olembe, 2016–present

See also 
 National Library of Cameroon
 List of national archives

References

Bibliography

External links
 Partial Listing of Cameroon National Archives

Cameroon
Archives in Cameroon
Yaoundé
1966 establishments in Cameroon